Andrea Moody (born February 20, 1978) is a former freestyle swimmer from Canada, who competed at the 1996 Summer Olympics for her native country. She finished in seventh place with the women's 4×100-metre freestyle relay team, swimming the third leg, alongside Shannon Shakespeare, Julie Howard and Marianne Limpert.  Moody was coached by Sam Montgomery.

References

External links
 
 
 

1978 births
Living people
Canadian female freestyle swimmers
Olympic swimmers of Canada
Swimmers at the 1996 Summer Olympics
Pan American Games silver medalists for Canada
Pan American Games bronze medalists for Canada
Pan American Games medalists in swimming
Swimmers at the 1995 Pan American Games
Sportspeople from Abbotsford, British Columbia
Sportspeople from British Columbia
Medalists at the 1995 Pan American Games